Janko Janković (born 14 January 1963) is a Croatian retired footballer who played as a forward.

Club career
Janković was born in Split, Croatia, Socialist Federal Republic of Yugoslavia. After playing in his country with NK Solin, HNK Hajduk Split (only two matches in one full season), RNK Split and HNK Rijeka, the 25-year-old moved to Spain, where he would remain for nearly one full decade until his retirement.

Janković started at Real Valladolid, after signing at the same time as compatriot Mauro Ravnić – his teammate at Rijeka – and was an essential attacking element in his debut campaign, as the Castile and León club finished sixth in La Liga and reached the final of the Copa del Rey.

After another year, Janković signed with Real Oviedo, teaming up with another two Croatians, Nenad Gračan and Nikola Jerkan. With the Asturians he left much of the offensive burden to veteran striker Carlos, only scoring once in double digits but never suffering relegation during his five-year spell, and helping with three goals in 33 games in his debut campaign as the team qualified for the UEFA Cup.

Aged 32, Janković signed for Hércules CF, scoring ten times to help the Alicante side promote from the second division in his first year. After their immediate relegation, he retired from the game.

International career
In 1994, Janković played two matches for the Croatian national team, his debut coming on 23 March as he featured the first half in a 2–0 friendly win against Spain, in Valencia.

Honours
Hajduk Split
Yugoslav Cup: 1984

Hércules
Segunda División: 1995-96

Statistics

As a player

References

External links

1963 births
Living people
Footballers from Split, Croatia
Yugoslav footballers
Croatian footballers
Association football forwards
Yugoslav First League players
NK Solin players
HNK Hajduk Split players
RNK Split players
HNK Rijeka players
La Liga players
Segunda División players
Real Valladolid players
Real Oviedo players
Hércules CF players
Croatia international footballers
Croatian expatriate footballers
Expatriate footballers in Spain
Croatian expatriate sportspeople in Spain